

Athletics
Baldwin High School offers many different sports and extracurricular programs for its students. The Bulldogs are classified as a 4A school according to the Kansas State High School Activities Association. Additionally, the Bulldogs have won several state championships in both athletic and non-athletic programs.

Administrative staff
 Principal – Brant Brittingham
 Assistant principal – Kelli Haeffner
 Activities director – Gary Stevanus

References

External links

Public high schools in Kansas
Schools in Douglas County, Kansas
1995 establishments in Kansas